is a Japanese fashion model and actress represented by Avex Management.

Biography
On 2004 Oishi won the Miss Seventeen Grand Prix for the fashion magazine Seventeen. She was an exclusive model until her graduation during the release of the April 2009 issue.

Oishi became a regular model for the magazine ViVi since the release of the June 2009 issue. She is also a regular model for the magazines More and Maquia.

Filmography

TV series

Variety

Drama

Music videos

Advertisements

Events

Mobile series

Films

Catalogs

Bibliography

Photobooks

Magazines

References

External links
 

Japanese female models
Japanese actresses
1988 births
Living people
Actors from Shizuoka Prefecture
Models from Shizuoka Prefecture